Olympique de Marseille won Division 1 season 1989–90 of the French Association Football League with 53 points.

Participating teams

 Auxerre
 Bordeaux
 Stade Brest
 SM Caen
 AS Cannes
 Lille
 Olympique Lyonnais
 Olympique Marseille
 FC Metz
 AS Monaco
 Montpellier HSC
 FC Mulhouse
 FC Nantes Atlantique
 OGC Nice
 RC Paris
 Paris Saint-Germain FC
 AS Saint-Etienne
 FC Sochaux-Montbéliard
 Sporting Toulon Var
 Toulouse FC

League table

Promoted from Division 2, who will play in Division 1 season 1990/1991
 AS Nancy: Champion of Division 2, winner of Division 2 group A
 Stade Rennais: Runner-up, winner of Division 2 group B

Results

Relegation play-offs

|}

Statistics

Top goalscorers

References

 Division 1 season 1989-1990 at pari-et-gagne.com

Ligue 1 seasons
France
1